Process Media is an independent publishing house started in 2005 in Los Angeles by Adam Parfrey of Feral House and Jodi Wille of Dilettante Press, and headquartered in Port Townsend.

Awards

Independent Publisher Book Awards 
 2006 Best Historical Fiction Book. Winner: The Nero Prediction by Humphry Knipe
 2006 Best Book on Sexuality/Relationships. Winner: Sex Machines by Timothy Archibald
 2006 Best Juvenile/Teen Young Adult Non-fiction. Finalist: Go Ask Ogre by Jolene Siana
 2007 Best Reference Book of the Year. Bronze: Preparedness Now! by Aton Edwards
 2008 Best Popular Culture Book. Bronze Award: The Source: The Untold Story of Father Yod, Ya Ho Wa 13, and The Source Family by Isis Aquarian
 2008 Best Biography. Bronze: Moondog, The Viking of Sixth Avenue by Robert Scotto

Other awards 
 2008 ARSC Award for Excellence. Best Research in Recorded Classical Music, History: Moondog, The Viking of Sixth Avenue by Robert Scotto

References

External links
Process Media official website

Book publishing companies based in Washington (state)
Publishing companies established in 2005